Brush Lake may refer to:

 Brush Lake, Boundary County, Idaho; a lake of Idaho
Brush Lake (Berrien County, Michigan)
Brush Lake (South Dakota)
Brush Lake (North Dakota/Saskatchewan), an international lake of North America
Brush Lake State Park, Montana